This is a list of the first minority male lawyer(s) and judge(s) in Michigan. It includes the year in which the men were admitted to practice law (in parentheses). Also included are men who achieved other distinctions such becoming the first in their state to graduate from law school or become a political figure.

Firsts in state history

Lawyers 

 First African American: John C. McLeod (1870) 
First African American lawyer to appear before the Michigan Supreme Court: David "D." Augustus Straker during the 1880s 
First Asian American male (Japanese descent): Arthur K. Ozawa (1910) 
 First Arab American and Muslim-American male: Michael Berry (1950)

State judges 

 First Jewish American male (Third Judicial Circuit): Harry B. Keidan in 1927
 First African American male: Charles W. Jones in 1950  
 First African-American male (Michigan Supreme Court): Otis M. Smith (1950) in 1961  
 First Latino American male: George La Plata (1956) in 1973  
 First Muslim American male: Adam Shakoor in 1981  
 First African American male (Chief Justice; Michigan Supreme Court): Conrad Mallett, Jr. (1979) around 1994 
 First openly gay male: Rudolph "Rudy" Serra in 2004  
 First blind male (Michigan Supreme Court): Richard H. Bernstein (1999) in 2014

Federal judge 

 First African American male (bankruptcy referee): Harry G. Hackett in 1954

Assistant Attorney General 

 First African American male: Harold E. Bledsoe

United States Attorney 

 First African American male: Saul A. Green  
 First African American male (Western District of Michigan): Patrick Miles Jr. in 2012

Bar Association 

First Jewish American male president: William H. Ellmann 
First African American male president: Dennis Archer (1970) from 1984-1985

Faculty 

 First African-American male (University of Michigan Law School professor): Harry T. Edwards (1965) in 1970

Firsts in local history 
 Stuart Dunnings Jr. (1950): First African-American male lawyer in Lansing, Michigan [Ingham, Clinton, and Eaton Counties, Michigan]
 Oscar W. Baker: First African-American male lawyer in Bay City, Michigan [Bay County, Michigan]
 James Golden (1928): First African American male lawyer in Battle Creek, Michigan [Calhoun County, Michigan]
 Ollie B. Bivins Jr.: First African American male to serve as a Judge of the Flint Municipal Court (1969) and Genesee County Circuit Court, Michigan (1972)
 Elisha Scott: First African American male to serve as an administrative judge in Flint, Michigan [Genesee County, Michigan]
Claude W. Haywood: First African American male admitted to the Genesee County Bar Association, Michigan
 William Price III: First African American male to serve as President of the Genesee County Bar Association, Michigan (1970-1971)
 Stuart Black: First African American judge in Isabella County, Michigan (2018)
 Charles A. Pratt: First African American male judge in Kalamazoo County, Michigan (1968)
Leroy Densmore Jr.: First African American male to serve as the Assistant District Attorney in Kalamazoo County, Michigan (c. 1973)
Olivier M. Green: First African American male elected as a member of the Grand Rapids Bar Association (1925) [Kent County, Michigan]
John T. Letts: First African American male elected as a judge in Kent County, Michigan (1959)
Oliver Green: First African-American male lawyer in Pontiac, Michigan (1926) [Oakland County, Michigan]
Michael Martinez: First Hispanic American male judge in Oakland County, Michigan (2004)
Jake Cunningham: First openly LGBT male judge in Oakland County, Michigan (2019)
Terry L. Clark: First African American male judge in Saginaw County, Michigan
Philip J. Williams: First Greek American male lawyer in Detroit, Michigan [Wayne County, Michigan]
 Harry B. Keidan: First Jewish American male appointed as a Judge of the Third Judicial Circuit in Michigan (1927) [Wayne County, Michigan]
Elvin L. Davenport: First African American male elected as a Judge of the Common Pleas Court for the City of Detroit (1956) and later the Recorder’s Court for the City of Detroit (1957) [Wayne County, Michigan]
Damon J. Keith: First African American male lawyer for the Wayne County Friend of the Court (1959)
Wade McCree Jr.: First African American male appointed as a Judge of the Wayne County Circuit Court in Michigan
Isidore Torres: First Latino American male judge in Wayne County, Michigan (1983)
Frank H. Wu: First Asian American male to serve as the Dean of Wayne State University Law School (2004)

See also 

 List of first minority male lawyers and judges in the United States

Other topics of interest 

 List of first women lawyers and judges in the United States
 List of first women lawyers and judges in Michigan

References 

 
Minority, Michigan, first
Minority, Michigan, first
Legal history of Michigan
Lists of people from Michigan
Michigan lawyers